The 1893 Michigan State Normal Normalites football team represented Michigan State Normal School (later renamed Eastern Michigan University) during the 1893 college football season.  In their first and only season under head coach Ernest P. Goodrich, the Normalites compiled a record of 4–2, and outscored their opponents by a combined total of 116 to 100. J. M. Swift was the team captain.

Schedule

References

Michigan State Normal
Eastern Michigan Eagles football seasons
Michigan State Normal Normalites football